Sidney Thomas Mayow Newman, CBE, FRSE (4 March 1906 – 22 September 1971) was a music scholar, academic, pianist and conductor.

Born in London, he was educated at Christ Church, Oxford, where he was organ scholar from 1924 to 1928, took a first-class Bachelor of Arts degree in classics and then read for the Bachelor of Music degree; he then studied the violin, piano, conducting and composition at the Royal College of Music between 1929 and 1930. In 1930, he was appointed lecturer at Armstrong College, Durham, and as conductor of Newcastle upon Tyne's Bach choir. In 1941, he was appointed to the Reid Professorship of Music at the University of Edinburgh, and remained in the chair until 1970. He was elected to the Royal Society of Edinburgh in 1941, and was awarded an honorary Doctor of Music degree from Durham University in 1946. He was the Cramb Lecturer at the University of Glasgow in 1956 and was appointed a Commander of the Order of the British Empire in 1962.

According to The Times, "though a skilled contrapuntist and scholar, notably of Bach, he published little ... but [at the Reid School] was able to sustain the high standards of musicianship, scholarship and performance established during Tovey's reign—indeed he was a less erratic conductor". He died, aged 65, only a year after retiring from the Reid chair.

References 

1906 births
1971 deaths
English musicologists
Alumni of Christ Church, Oxford
Alumni of the Royal College of Music
Academics of Durham University
Academics of the University of Edinburgh
Commanders of the Order of the British Empire
Fellows of the Royal Society of Edinburgh